KADT may refer to:

 KADT-LD, a low-power television station (channel 16) licensed to Killeen, Texas, United States
 Atwood-Rawlins County City-County Airport (ICAO code KADT)